Américo Ferreira Lopes (born 6 March 1933), known simply as Américo, is a Portuguese former footballer who played as a goalkeeper.

Club career
Born in Santa Maria de Lamas, Aveiro District, Américo spent the vast majority of his professional career with FC Porto, competing 13 seasons in the Primeira Liga and appearing in 250 official matches. With his only club, he won the 1959 national championship and the 1968 Taça de Portugal.

From 1954 to 1958, Américo was loaned to neighbouring Boavista FC, playing his last three years in the second division. He retired in June 1969, aged 36.

International career
Américo made his debut for the Portugal national team on 29 April 1964, in a 3–2 friendly away win over Switzerland. He was selected by manager Otto Glória for his 1966 FIFA World Cup squad, but remained an unused bench player for the eventual third-placed side.

Américo earned the last of his 15 caps on 11 December 1968, in a 4–2 loss in Greece for the 1970 World Cup qualifiers.

Honours
Porto
Primeira Liga: 1958–59
Taça de Portugal: 1967–68

References

External links

1933 births
Living people
Sportspeople from Santa Maria da Feira
Portuguese footballers
Association football goalkeepers
Primeira Liga players
Liga Portugal 2 players
FC Porto players
Boavista F.C. players
Portugal international footballers
1966 FIFA World Cup players